The Gagliardi Trophy was first presented in 1993 to the Outstanding Division III college football player of the year by the Jostens Company and the J-Club of Saint John's University in Minnesota. Since that time, the award has become one of the leading collegiate football awards in Division III football, honoring excellence in athletics, academics and community service. The award is named for John Gagliardi, head football coach of Carroll College 1949 to 1952 and Saint John's University in Minnesota from 1953 to 2012. The trophy was presented by the Salem Rotary Club each year in Salem, Virginia until 2018.

Winners

Winners by school

References

External links
The Gagliardi Trophy

Awards established in 1993
College football national player awards
NCAA Division III football